Sar Tang (also Romanized as Sar-e Tang; also known as Sar-e Tal, Sar-e Tall, Sar-e Tol, and Sar Tal) is a village in Kohurestan Rural District, in the Central District of Khamir County, Hormozgan Province, Iran. At the 2006 census, its population was 119, in 25 families.

References 

Populated places in Khamir County